Most of the newspapers started in North Carolina in the 18th-century no longer exist.  The first newspaper, the North Carolina Gazette was published in New Bern, North Carolina.  These defunct newspapers of North Carolina were replaced by newspapers that started in the 19th-century.  With the progress of technology, introduction of social media, and trend towards corporate conglomerate ownership many newspapers did not survive in the 20th and 21st-century.

Newspapers published in the 18th-century 
There are currently 84 newspapers known to have been published in North Carolina between 1751 and 1800. Many newspapers went through one or more title changes, as shown in the table below.

Defunct newspapers established in the 19th- and 20th- centuries
 
There were 495 North Carolina newspapers published between 1800 and 1860.  There were 1538 North Carolina newspapers published between 1860 and 1900.  There were 1,622 North Carolina newspapers published between 1900 and 2010.  There were approximately 240 North Carolina newspapers in publication at the beginning of 2020. 
 

Notes:

See also
 North Carolina literature
 List of defunct newspapers of the United States

Images

References

Bibliography
 
 
 
 
  (Includes information about weekly rural newspapers in North Carolina)
 
 
 
 
 
  (+ List of titles 50+ years old)
 
 
 
 
 
 
 
 
 

 
North Carolina
North Carolina Defunct
 
Newspapers
North Carolina Newspapers Defunct
North Carolina Newspapers Defunct
North Carolina Newspapers Defunct
Newspapers Defunct
North Carolina Newspapers Defunct
North Carolina Newspapers Defunct
North Carolina Newspapers Defunct
Mass media in North Carolina